Lonicera oblongifolia, also known as the swamp honeysuckle and swamp fly honeysuckle is a species of flowering plant belonging to the family Caprifoliaceae.

Its native range is the US and Canada.

References

oblongifolia